Todd Woodbridge and Mark Woodforde were the defending champions but lost in the quarterfinals to Ellis Ferreira and Jan Siemerink.

Mark Knowles and Daniel Nestor won in the final 3–6, 6–3, 6–4 against Sandon Stolle and Cyril Suk.

Seeds
The top four seeded teams received byes into the second round.

Draw

Final

Top half

Bottom half

References
 Main draw

Doubles
1996 Great American Insurance ATP Championships